Daniel Finch, 8th Earl of Winchilsea and 3rd Earl of Nottingham (24 May 16892 August 1769), of Burley House near Oakham in Rutland and of Eastwell Park near Ashford in Kent, was a British peer and politician.

Origins

Styled by the courtesy title Lord Finch until 1730, he was the eldest son and heir of Daniel Finch, 2nd Earl of Nottingham of Burley, by his second wife Anne Hatton, a daughter of Christopher Hatton, 1st Viscount Hatton. His father was a prominent Tory politician who had been one of the few leading Tories to actively support the Hanoverian succession.

Career
In 1710 he was elected (as Lord Finch and aged 21), as a Member of Parliament for Rutland and served as Comptroller of the Royal Household from 1725 to 1730. He held the seat until he succeeded to the Earldom in 1730 (necessitating his move to the House of Lords). In 1739 he supported the founding of the Foundling Hospital in London, a charity providing home and education for some of the capital's many abandoned children, and was one of the original governors.

Although his father had been a supporter of Walpole, Winchilsea became instead a supporter of Lord Carteret in the so-called "Patriot Opposition". When Carteret became leading minister in 1742, Winchilsea joined him, becoming First Lord of the Admiralty (1742–1744). Later on, he allied himself with the Duke of Newcastle and the Old Whigs, and served as Lord President of the Council in the Rockingham administration (1765–1766). He was made a Knight of the Garter in 1752.

Marriages & issue

He married twice but failed to produce male issue:
Firstly to Lady Frances Feilding, a daughter of Basil Feilding, 4th Earl of Denbigh by his wife Hester Firebrace, by whom he had one daughter: 
Lady Charlotte Finch, who died unmarried.
Secondly he married Mary Palmer, the second daughter and co-heiress of Sir Thomas Palmer, 4th Baronet of Wingham, by his wife Elizabeth Marsham, a sister of Robert Marsham, 1st Baron Romney and a daughter of Sir Robert Marsham, 4th Baronet. By his second wife he had eight daughters, only four of whom survived to adulthood, Heneage, Essex, Hatton and Augusta:
Lady Mary Finch (b. 7 December 1739);
Lady Frances Finch (b. 24 October 1740);
Lady Heneage Finch (1 December 1741 –1820), who in 1788 married (as his second wife) Maj.-Gen. Sir George Osborn, 4th Baronet;
Lady Anne Finch (b. 9 June 1743);
Lady Georgina Finch (b. 10 July 1744);
Lady Essex Finch (b. 1 January 1746);
Lady Hatton Finch (23 February 1747 –1829), who died unmarried;
Lady Augusta Elizabeth Finch (14 February 1751 –1797), who died unmarried.

Death & burial
He died in 1769 and was buried at Eastwell Church, near his residence. As he died without male issue his titles, together with his estates at Burley and elsewhere, passed to his nephew George Finch, 9th Earl of Winchilsea, the son of his brother the diplomat William Finch. He left his Kentish properties, including Eastwell Park, to his other nephew George Finch-Hatton, son of his brother Edward Finch.

References

External links
 Daniel Finch, 8th Earl of Winchilsea, 3rd Earl of Nottingham at the British Museum

 

1689 births
1769 deaths
Finch, Daniel Finch, Lord
Finch, Daniel Finch, Lord
Finch, Daniel Finch, Lord
Finch, Daniel Finch, Lord
Finch, Daniel Finch, Lord
Finch, Daniel Finch, Lord
Lord Presidents of the Council
08
703
Lords of the Admiralty
Knights of the Garter
Members of the Privy Council of Great Britain
Daniel
Freemasons of the Premier Grand Lodge of England
People from Burley, Rutland